Boyd Almon Hill (September 16, 1878 – December 31, 1908) was an American football and basketball coach. He served as the head football coach at Central State Normal School—now known as the University of Central Oklahoma—in 1904, the Haskell Institute—now known as Haskell Indian Nations University—in 1905, and Oklahoma Agricultural and Mechanical College—now known as Oklahoma State University–Stillwater—from 1906 to 1907, compiling a career college football record of 9–16–4. Hill was also the head basketball coach at Oklahoma A&M for one season in 1907–08, tallying a mark of 2–3.

Hill was born on September 16, 1878, in Harlem, Illinois and graduated from high school in Belvidere, Illinois. He entered the United States Military Academy in 1899, but left in 1902 due to illness. Hill move to Beaver County, Oklahoma in 1903 and then to Edmond, Oklahoma, where he graduated from Central State Normal School in 1905. He died of meningitis on December 31, 1908, at his home in Stillwater, Oklahoma.

Head coaching record

Football

References

External links
 

1878 births
1908 deaths
Central Oklahoma Bronchos football coaches
Haskell Indian Nations Fighting Indians football coaches
Oklahoma State Cowboys basketball coaches
Oklahoma State Cowboys football coaches
University of Central Oklahoma alumni
People from Belvidere, Illinois
Coaches of American football from Illinois
Basketball coaches from Illinois
People from Winnebago County, Illinois
Neurological disease deaths in Oklahoma
Infectious disease deaths in Oklahoma
Deaths from meningitis